Toulson is a surname. Notable people with the surname include:

Lois Toulson (born 1999), British diver
Robert Tounson or Toulson (1575-1621), British dean and bishop
Roger Toulson, Lord Toulson (1946-2017), British lawyer and judge
Shirley Toulson (1924-2018), British writer
Simon Toulson-Clarke (born 1961), British singer, member of Red Box

See also
Maude R. Toulson Federal Building, federal building in Maryland, United States